The bignose fanskate (Sympterygia acuta) is a species of fish in the family Arhynchobatidae. It is found off Argentina, Brazil, and Uruguay. Its natural habitats are open seas and shallow seas.

References

Sympterygia
Fish described in 1877
Taxonomy articles created by Polbot